Bil Keating (Died 2022) was an Irish television and theatrical producer, director, lighting designer and founder of the Bil Keating Centre in Dublin.

Born and raised in Allingham Buildings in The Liberties, Dublin, he later moved to London. His training in stagecraft in London in the 1950s led to a director job with the BBC.  His productions include Brendan Behan's play The Hostage. He also directed The Late Late Show for RTE in Ireland. Keatng continues to direct television programmes and was formerly a tutor at the Bil Keating Centre teaching television production.

References 

Irish television producers
Living people
Year of birth missing (living people)